The 1952 NFL season was the 33rd regular season of the National Football League. Prior to the season, the legacy of the Dayton Triangles, the final remaining Ohio League member and the franchise then known as the New York Yanks owner Ted Collins sold his team back to the NFL. A few days later, a new team was then awarded to an ownership group in Dallas, Texas, after it purchased the assets of the Yanks.

However, the new Dallas Texans went  and were sold back to the league midway through the season. For the team's last five games, the league operated the Texans as a road team, with the franchise "returning to its roots" as a traveling team just as they were in the 1920s when they were known as the Dayton Triangles, with them becoming the final traveling team to date in NFL history, using Hershey, Pennsylvania, as a home base. One of their final two "home" games were held at the Rubber Bowl in Akron, Ohio, the other one played at the opposing team's (Detroit) stadium. After the season ended, the league considers the Texans to have folded, however all of the Triangles-Texans players and assets were awarded to Carroll Rosenbloom for the following year, becoming the new Baltimore Colts, keeping the blue and white color scheme, and the assets of the franchise ultimately never missing a season in some form.  This left Dallas without a professional football franchise until the births of the Dallas Cowboys and the AFL version of the Dallas Texans in 1960.

The Detroit Lions defeated the Cleveland Browns in the NFL Championship Game.

This was the last NFL season prior to the introduction of regular season overtime in 1974 that there were no ties in the regular season.

Draft
The 1952 NFL Draft was held on January 17, 1952 at Philadelphia's Hotel Statler. With the first pick, the Los Angeles Rams selected quarterback Bill Wade from Vanderbilt University.

Major rule changes
Offensive players will not be called for illegal motion as long as they do not move forward prior to the snap.
The penalty for offensive pass interference is 15 yards from the previous spot, unless the result on a fourth down play is a touchback.
A player who commits a palpably (obviously) unfair act is ejected from the game.

Regular season

Highlights
In Week One (September 28), the Cleveland Browns hosted a rematch of their 1951 title game loss to the Rams, which had taken place in Los Angeles.  That 24–17 loss was avenged with a 37–7 win for the Browns.  The NFL's newest team, the Dallas Texans, played their first game, but a crowd of only 17,499 turned out to watch the visiting Giants.  The Texans scored first, on a pass from George Taliaferro to Buddy Young, two of the few African-American players in the NFL at that time.  The Giants scored the rest of the points in a 24–6 win.
Week Three (October 12) the Giants beat the Browns 17–9, and the 49ers shut out the Lions 28–0, as both stayed unbeaten on the road.
Week Four (October 19) saw the 49ers stay unbeaten with a 40–18 win over the Bears, while the Chicago Cardinals spoiled the Giants' home opener, 24–23.
San Francisco's streak finally ended on November 2 in Week Six when the Bears visited.  The 49ers were leading, 17–10 in the 4th quarter, when Frankie Albert made an unnecessary gamble in a 4th and 4 on his own 31-yard line, trying to gain yardage on a fake punt.  Chicago took over on downs and tied the game three plays later, and George Blanda's 48-yard field goal gave them a 20–17 win.
In Week Seven (November 9), the 49ers lost in New York, 23–14, while Detroit beat Pittsburgh 31–6 and Cleveland beat the Cardinals 28–13.  Both conference races were tied, with the Giants and Browns in the American, and the Lions joining the 49ers in the National, all with 5–2–0 records.  In Dallas, only 10,000 turned out in a drizzle to watch the Texans fall to 0–7–0 in a 27–6 loss to the Rams.  It proved to be the Texans' last Cotton Bowl date, and the last pro football game played in the state of Texas until 1960.  After losses of $250,000 and failed attempts to get refinancing, the team's 16 stockholders surrendered the franchise three days later, the league took over its operations, and the remaining games in Dallas were moved.<ref>"Dallas Texans Go Broke; Team Goes Back to League," The Lowell (Mass.) Sun, Nov 13, 1952, p29</ref>
In Week Eight (November 16) the Browns had a 22–0 lead over Pittsburgh and then withstood a four touchdown passing attack by Jim Finks in a 29–28 win.  A safety, caused when Finks had been sacked in the end zone earlier, was the margin of victory.  With the Giants' 17–3 loss to Green Bay, Cleveland took over first place in the American Conference.  Meanwhile, Detroit and San Francisco both won to stay tied in the National.
Week Nine (November 23) saw a seven-way tie for the NFL's best record, with more than half of the teams at 6–3–0, and only three games left in the season.  The 5–3 Rams beat the 6–2 49ers 35–9, and the 5–3 Eagles beat the 6–2 Browns 28–20.  The 3–5 Bears upset the visiting 6–2 Lions, 24–23, after George Blanda passed to Ed Sprinkle with 8 seconds to play.  In addition, the 5–3 Giants and the 5–3 Packers won their games against Washington (14–10) and Dallas (42–14) respectively.
This oddity only lasted a few days. Week Ten began on Thanksgiving Day, as the Lions beat the Packers 48–24.  The same day, November 27, the 0–9–0 Texans played the Bears in Akron, Ohio after Dallas and Chicago were both unavailable.  The Texans blew an 18-point lead, but with 0:34 to play, Frank Tripucka scored and the NFL's orphaned team registered its first (and last) win, 27–23.  About 3,000 Ohioans watched the game, compared to 14,800 who packed the stadium earlier that day to watch a high school game.  On November 30, the Rams and 49ers, both 6–3–0, met for the second straight week, this time in San Francisco, and the L.A. team won 34–21.  The NFL's two other 6–3 teams, the Eagles and the Giants, both lost on the road.  The Cards beat Philly 28–22.  The 3–6 Steelers, however, handed the Giants their worst defeat ever, beginning with a 91-yard return of the opening kickoff by Lynn Chandnois and ending 63–7.  With that, the Browns were alone in the American race, while the Lions and Rams were tied in the National.
The Browns, Lions and Rams won again in Week Eleven, as did Philadelphia, but the Giants were eliminated with a 27–17 loss to Washington.
In the final games of the regular season (December 14) in Week Twelve, Detroit won 41–6 in the last NFL game for the Dallas Texans, and the Rams beat Pittsburgh 28–14, tying both for the American title at 9–3–0, and forcing a playoff.  In the National Conference, the 7–4 Eagles were hoping for the 8–3 Browns to lose, and Cleveland fell in New York, 37–34, despite a fourth quarter comeback attempt.  Playing against the last place (2–8) Redskins, the Eagles had a 21–14 lead in the fourth quarter, but Eddie LeBaron crossed the goal line with 0:18 to play, for Washington's only home win in 1952, and handing the Browns the conference title.

Conference races

Final standings

Playoffs
The Lions hosted and won the National Conference playoff. The Browns hosted the NFL Championship Game, but were defeated by the Lions.

League leaders

Coaching changes
Offseason
Chicago Cardinals: Joe Kuharich became the new Cardinals head coach. Curly Lambeau resigned after 10 games into 1951. Phil Handler and Cecil Isbell then served as co-head coaches for the final two games of the 1951 season.
Dallas Texans: The team retained the services of the former New York Yanks' head coach, James Phelan.
Philadelphia Eagles: Jim Trimble became the new head coach. Bo McMillin retired after two games into 1951 after he was diagnosed with terminal stomach cancer. Wayne Millner served as interim for the rest of that season.
Pittsburgh Steelers: John Michelosen was replaced by Joe Bach.
Washington Redskins: Curly Lambeau became the new head coach. Herman Ball was fired after three games into 1951. Dick Todd served as interim for the rest of the season.

In-season
Los Angeles Rams: Joe Stydahar resigned after one game into the season, and was replaced by Hamp Pool.

Stadium changes
 The Dallas Texans played their first four regular season home games at the Cotton Bowl in Dallas, their fifth home game at the Rubber Bowl in Akron, Ohio, and their sixth and last home game at the opposing team's stadium (the Detroit Lions' Briggs Stadium)
 The Green Bay Packers home games in Milwaukee moved from Wisconsin State Fair Park to Marquette Stadium

References

 NFL Record and Fact Book
 NFL History 1951–1960 (Last accessed December 4, 2005)
 Total Football: The Official Encyclopedia of the National Football League''

National Football League seasons